The Online Film Critics Society Award for Best Breakthrough Filmmaker is an annual film award given by the Online Film Critics Society to honor the best breakthrough filmmaker of the year.

Winners
1999 (as Best Debut): Spike Jonze
for directing Being John Malkovich
2001: Christopher Nolan
for directing Memento
2002: Mark Romanek
for directing One Hour Photo
2003: Shari Springer Berman and Robert Pulcini
for directing American Splendor
2004: Zach Braff
for directing Garden State
2005: Paul Haggis
for directing Crash
2006: Jonathan Dayton and Valerie Faris
for directing Little Miss Sunshine
2007: Sarah Polley
for directing Away From Her
2008: Tomas Alfredson
for directing Let the Right One In

References